Christopher Peterson is an American costume designer. He was nominated for an Academy Award in the category Best Costume Design for Martin Scorsese's epic crime film The Irishman (2019) at the 92nd Academy Awards, for which he shared the nomination with Sandy Powell.

Selected filmography 
 The Irishman (2019; co-nominated with Sandy Powell)

References

External links 

Living people
Place of birth missing (living people)
Year of birth missing (living people)
American costume designers